America's 10 Most Wanted, released as Fugitive Hunter: War on Terror in the US, is a first-person shooter game for the PlayStation 2 and Microsoft Windows platforms. Developed by Black Ops Entertainment and released in 2004, it was mainly received negatively due to its dated graphics and uninspired boss battles. It contains tracks and cameos by members of So Solid Crew. The European and US versions differentiate slightly in level music and terrorist names with Saddam Hussein only being present in the European version. The European manual shows Mullah Omar as one of the terrorists despite being absent in both versions.

Plot 
Set in the present, the game places the player into the role of Jake Seaver, a CIFR agent. Travelling to locations such as Utah, Paris, and Miami, the game finishes in Afghanistan, where the player must capture Saddam Hussein and Osama Bin Laden. The game contains 11 levels, one for each fugitive respectively, as well as a preceding introductory level.

Development
Preliminary development on the game dated back to the late 1990s.

In the United States, Infogrames was originally going to publish the title through their Atari label in June 2003, but the company dropped the release and was instead picked up by Encore Software.

Gameplay 
The game is a first-person shooter, featuring arcade-style fights as a means of capturing fugitives.

Reception 

The game was generally received poorly, due to dated graphics and sub-standard gameplay. For example, Scott Rhodie of CNET Australia stated that "the sound is pathetic, the gameplay terrible, the graphics an embarrassment for a modern game and the premise simply shocking".

References

External Links
 

2003 video games
First-person shooters
PlayStation 2 games
Propaganda video games
Video games scored by Tommy Tallarico
Video games about terrorism
Video games developed in the United States
Video games set in Afghanistan
Video games set in Miami
Video games set in Paris
Video games set in Utah
Windows games
Multiplayer and single-player video games
Cultural depictions of Saddam Hussein
Cultural depictions of Osama bin Laden
War in Afghanistan (2001–2021) video games
Encore Software games
Black Ops Entertainment games